Lokayata: A Study in Ancient Indian Materialism is a famous book on the Lokayata school of Indian philosophy by Debiprasad Chattopadhyaya first published in 1959.

In this book Chattopadhyaya used the method of historical materialism to explore the dehavada of Lokayatas which revealed how their philosophy was connected with the mode of securing material means of subsistence. The study questioned the mainstream view that Indian philosophy's sole concern was the concept of Brahman. "From the scattered references in the ancient philosophical literature which were completely hostile to the ancient materialist schools, Debiprasad Chattopadhyaya reconstructed the philosophy of Lokayata, which consistently denied the existence of Brahman and viewed pratyaksa (perception) as the sole means of knowledge. He demolished the so-called "interpretation of synthesis" which sought to combine the diverse philosophical traditions of India to form a ladder that leads to the philosophy of Advaita Vedanta.

Commenting on Lokayata the German indologist Walter Ruben called Chattopadhayaya a "thought-reformer", who was "conscious of his great responsibility towards his people living in a period of struggle for national awakening and of world-wide fighting for the forces of materialism, progress, humanism and peace against imperialism. He has written this book Lokayata: A Study in Ancient Indian Materialism against the old fashioned conception that India was and is the land of dreamers and mystics".

The book has been translated into many Indian languages including Kannada and Telugu.

Further reading 
Chattopadhyaya, Debiprasad (1959) Lokayata: A Study of Ancient Indian Materialism. New Delhi: People's Publishing House. 978-8170070061

References

External links 
Lokayata: A Study in Ancient Indian Materialism (1959, first edition) by Debiprasad Chattopadhayay on archive.org 
1959 non-fiction books
Contemporary philosophical literature
Philosophy books